The list of ship commissionings in 1932 includes a chronological list of all ships commissioned in 1932.


See also 

1932
 Ship commissionings